Kounaviano Gorge is a gorge near Heraklion, Crete.

Etymology
The gorge gets its name from the nearby village of Kounavi (el).

Location
The gorge starts near the village of Peza and can be entered west of the village of Myrtia. It runs for about  towards the north and parallel to Astrakiano gorge. A small stream, which is a tributary of the Karteros river, flows through the gorge. The two gorges meet at Kaki Rachi near the village of Skalani (el), forming the Karteros gorge. Kounaviano gorge is part of the Juktas eco-park.

Features
Kounaviano gorge has lush vegetation that includes plane trees, willows, kermes oaks and fig trees. A well-signed path along the gorge is easy to cross and takes about two hours. Along this path there are several abandoned watermills and charcoal piles.

External links
Kounaviano gorge from archanes-asterousia.gr
Kounaviano gorge from cretanbeaches.com

References

Landforms of Heraklion (regional unit)
Gorges of Crete
Tourist attractions in Crete